Beta Eridani (β Eridani, abbreviated Beta Eri, β Eri), formally named Cursa , is the second-brightest star in the constellation of Eridanus, located in the northeast end of this constellation near the shared border with Orion. The apparent visual magnitude of this star is 2.796, so it can be viewed with the naked eye in dark skies.

Nomenclature 

Beta Eridani is the star's Bayer designation. This is the name of the star association consisting of this star along with Lambda Eridani, Psi Eridani and Tau Orionis.
According to a NASA catalogue of stars,  was the title of three stars: β Eri is Cursa, Psi Eridani , and Lambda Eridani  (excluding Tau Orionis).
In 2016, the International Astronomical Union organized a Working Group on Star Names (WGSN) to catalog and standardize proper names for stars. The WGSN's first bulletin of July 2016 included a table of the first two batches of names approved by the WGSN; which included Cursa for this star.

Consequently, the Chinese name for β Eridani itself is "the third star of Jade Well".
In older texts,  was also spelt .

Properties
β Eridani has a spectral type of A3 III, with the luminosity class III indicating that this is a giant star which has consumed the hydrogen at its core and evolved away from the main sequence. The effective temperature of the outer envelope is about 8,104 K, which gives the star a white hue typical of A-type stars. The projected rotational velocity is a rapid , compared to  along the Sun's equator. The star is known to vary in apparent visual magnitude, ranging between 2.72 and 2.80. A particularly strong flare up was reported in 1985.

The location and trajectory of this star suggest that it is a member of the Ursa Major supergroup, an association of stars that share a common origin and motion through space. However, its photometric properties indicate that it may instead be an interloper. Beta Eridani has an optical companion star with an apparent magnitude 10.90 at an angular separation of 120 arcseconds and a position angle of 148°. It has the catalogue identifier CCDM J05079-0506B.

References

A-type giants
Double stars
Ursa Major Moving Group

Cursa
Eridanus (constellation)
Eridani, Beta
BD-05 1162
Eridani, 67
9175
033111
023875
1666